Cleistesiopsis oricamporum, called the  small Coastal Plain spreading pogonia, is a terrestrial species of orchid native to the southeastern United States from Louisiana to North Carolina.

References

External links
iNaturalist,  small Coastal Plain spreading pogonia (Cleistesiopsis oricamporum) 
Go Orchids, North American Orchid Conservation Center,  Cleistesiopsis oricamporum P.M.Br. Small Coastal Plain Spreading Pogonia

Pogonieae
Orchids of the United States
Orchids of Florida
Endemic flora of the United States
Flora of the Southeastern United States
Flora without expected TNC conservation status